is a Japanese subscription video streaming and e-book and rental service operated by U-Next Co., Ltd., a subsidiary of Usen-Next Holdings.

U-Next is a wide variety of content including movies, TV shows, anime, e-books, and live sports. It was launched in 2007 as Gyao Next (often stylized as GyaO Next) and has since grown to become one of the largest streaming platforms in Japan, with over 2.8 million registered users. U-Next also offers unique features such as offline viewing, simultaneous streaming on multiple devices, and movie ticket purchase with points.

History 
In June 2006, Usen began a project to investigate the possibility of watching Gyao, a video streaming service for PCs owned by the company, on television. Gyao, which was later operated by Yahoo! Japan and terminated its services in 2023, was one of the most influential platforms in Japan's online video distribution market at the time.

On February 1, 2007, Usen started selling Gyao Plus, a set-top box that allowed users to watch Gyao on their televisions. At the time, the set-top box had internet connectivity, but could only be used to watch Gyao.

On June 1, 2007, Gyao Next, a pay-per-view video distribution service using Gyao Plus, was launched. Unlike Gyao, which was available for free, Gyao Next cost 3,900 yen to 4,950 yen per month in addition to the initial cost and the set-top box fee (rental or purchase). Gyao refreshes its catalog every 10 days to 2 weeks, while Gyao Next is an archive. As a result, there was little overlap between the two services in terms of user base." 

In June 2008, the price was reduced from ¥3,900/month to ¥2,980/month with the same content plus additional content such as all professional baseball games of the Pacific League and a number of karaoke songs.

On April 7, 2009, Yahoo! Japan announced that it would acquire 51% of the shares of Gyao, which had been a wholly owned subsidiary of Usen, from Usen for 529 million yen, making it a subsidiary. The acquisition was aimed at building the largest video platform in Japan by integrating it with Yahoo! Video, which is owned by Yahoo! Japan. Gyao Next, however, was not part of the deal.

On December 1, 2009, Gyao Next was renamed U-Next. The "U" includes the meanings of "United" and "Universe" as well as Usen. This business was transferred from Usen to its subsidiary U-Next Co., Ltd. in December 2010. U-Next Co., Ltd. was spun off from Usen as a private company of Yasuhide Uno, who was the president of Usen.

In April 2009, the service began offering music broadcasting (Usen on Flet's) from Usen, a cable broadcasting service. And in September 2009, the number of subscribers exceeded 100,000. As of November 2009, the service included approximately 25,000 videos (including 12,000 PPV videos), 15,000 karaoke videos, 9 channels, and 504 Usen music broadcast channels. As of July 2010, more than 50,000 titles had been distributed, including terrestrial broadcast dramas and missed anime broadcasts.U-Next was available by July 2010 on select models of Sony's Bravia, Sharp's Aquos, Toshiba's Regza, Hitachi's Wooo, Panasonic's Viera, and LG's Smart TV. 

In November 2013, the company announced a content partnership with 20th Century Fox to distribute more than 150 films.

In 2014, the service supported streaming by the iPhone, iPad, Android phones/tablets, AirPlay, and Chromecast. The following year, Dolby Audio (Dolby Digital Plus) was adopted to deliver 7.1 channels.

The e-book service was launched in April 2014 with the BookPlace for U-Next app and integrated with the video service in 2019. Also in the same year, U-Next partnered with theater chain T-Joy to allow movie tickets to be purchased by U-Next points; in 2016, it formed similar partnerships with Shochiku Multiplex Theaters and United Cinemas; and in 2017, with Tokyu Recreation. In 2022, they also partnered with Toho Cinemas, the only remaining major theater chain.

On December 16, 2014, U-Next was listed on the Tokyo Stock Exchange Mothers. In 2015, the company changed its listing to the First Section of the Tokyo Stock Exchange.

In February 2017, U-Next announced that it would conduct a tender offer for shares of Usen and integrate its operations. The company shifted to a holding company structure, with each business of U-Next and Usen placed as subsidiaries under the umbrella of the holding company Usen-Next Holdings.

In July 2020, U-Next acquired the anime-focused video streaming service Anime Hōdai through absorption-type split from SoftBank for 2.5 billion yen. Meanwhile, U-Next had been operating Anime Hōdai since 2015 before the acquisition.

In 2020, it was announced that the service had surpassed 2 million members as of August.

In March 2021, U-Next announced a partnership with WarnerMedia to exclusively distribute 199 HBO and HBO Max original productions in Japan by 2023. The company also announced plans to further strengthen its partnership agreement with Warner Bros. Discovery by distributing 332 of those productions in 2023.

In February 2022, U-Next announced plans to merge with Premium Platform Japan, which is owned by TBS Television and TV Tokyo, with the merger scheduled to take place on March 31. Paravi, the video streaming service operated by PPJ, is expected to be integrated into U-Next in July.  This merger is expected to create the largest domestic streaming service in Japan, surpassing Hulu Japan, with over 800 billion yen in revenue, 3.7 million paid subscribers, and 350,000 titles. It will be the second-largest video streaming service in the Japanese market, following Netflix.

References

External links 

 

Subscription video on demand services
Japanese film websites
Internet television streaming services
Subscription video streaming services
Android (operating system) software
IOS software
PlayStation 4 software
PlayStation 5 software